Kraishevo is a rural locality (a selo) and the administrative center of Kraishevskoye Rural Settlement, Yelansky District, Volgograd Oblast, Russia. The population was 1,204 as of 2010. There are 18 streets, secondary school, club and Great Patriotic War Memorial.

Geography 
Kraishevo is located on Khopyorsko-Buzulukskaya Plain on the bank of the Kraishevka River near its confluence into Tersa river, 33 km southeast of Yelan (the district's administrative centre) by road. Beryozovka is the nearest rural locality.

The village is located in pure steppe zone. The altitude above sea level is about 110—120 m. The floodplain and low tarraces of the Tersa are characterized by plains, channels, rare small areas of oak and alder forests, grasslands, plots of agricultural lands. The overlying terrain is characterized by steppes, dry channels, plains, agricultural lands, plots meadow steppes, meadows, broad-leaved and small-leaved forests.

There is a water spring near the village.

History 
The village was founded in 1799 (in 1771 by another data) by migrant settlers from Kerensk District (Uyezd) of Penza Governorate. Primarily the village belonged to Naryskins and later was transferred to the State Treasury. In 1808 the Treasury granted the village to major Ovsyanikov, who later sold it to major general Rusakov and court counselor Weber, and later from them the village was transferred to the State. Kraishevka village, also known as Troitskoye, is designated on the Detailed map of the Russian Empire of year 1816. The village was a part of Atkarsky District (Uyezd) of Saratov Governorate. In accordance with the Schematic map of Atkarsky District of year 1912, Kraishevka was a so called volost village (village forming a municipality). The fair was organized here.

In accordance with the List of settlements of Atkarsky District of year 1914 (based on the year 1911 data) the village was settled by the former state peasants, ethnically Great Russians (Velikorosy), summarily 3452 men and 3568 women. In the village there were the church, 2 zemstvo schools, church school, hospital, reception hospital, market.

In 1928 the village was included into Yelan District of Kamyshin Area of the Lower Volga Province (Nizhne-Volzhskiy Kray). Kamyshin Area was abolished in 1930 and in 1934 the Lower Volga Province became Stalingrad Province (Stalingradskiy Kray).
In 1935 the village was included into Vyazovka District. (In 1936 Vyazovka District was included into Stalingrad Province. In 1963, due to abolition of Vyazovka District, Kraishevo village was included into Yalan District. The village become the center of Kraishevo  Selsoviet (rural council).
Later Kraishevo became a part of Yelansky District of Volgograd Oblast.

References 

Rural localities in Yelansky District
Atkarsky Uyezd